Lars Jönsson (born 27 June 1970) is a former tennis player from Sweden, who turned professional in 1988. He did not win any ATP title (singles and/or doubles) during his career, best result was a singles final in Wellington. The right-hander reached his highest individual ranking on the ATP Tour on 7 October 1991, when he became ranked 67th in the world.

Career finals

Singles (1 loss)

References

External links
 
 

1970 births
Living people
Swedish male tennis players
Sportspeople from Gothenburg